Exide Life Insurance Company Limited was an Indian life insurance company. Exide Life Insurance distributes its products through multi-channels viz. Agency, Bancassurance, Corporate Agency & Broking as well as Direct Channels. The Agency channel consisted of over 40,000 advisors who are attached to over 200 company offices across the country. The company had over 15 lakh customers  and manages over INR 18,000 crores in assets. It had been operating since 2001 and was headquartered in Bangalore. It dealt with life insurance products, providing long-term protection and savings option.

Company merged with HDFC life in late 2022.

History 

In 2000, ING Insurance, a sub-holding company of Dutch financial major ING Group, tied up with Bangalore-based Vysya Bank to enter the Indian life insurance market thus forming the ING Vysya Life Insurance company. In the same year, ING Vysya Bank, ING Insurance, and the Damani Group formed a life insurance joint venture, this innovative collaboration marks the first bancassurance venture in India.

Exide Industries acquired 50% stakes of ING Vysya Life Insurance in 2005 and distributed its products through multi-channels viz. Agency, Banc assurance, Corporate Agency & Broking, Direct Channel and Online.

In 2008 owing to the financial crisis ING had to enter into a bailout agreement, thus starting a global restructuring strategy, and decided to exit the insurance business in India. Prior to India, ING exited its insurance ventures in Malaysia, Thailand and Hong Kong as well.

Exide Life Insurance 
After ING exited from India in January 2013, Exide Industries acquired the remainder 50% of the equity capital of ING Vysya Life Insurance, thus becoming 100% stakeholder.   In May 2014, following the approvals from Insurance Regulatory and Development Authority (IRDA) and the Ministry of Corporate Affairs, the name of ING Vysya Life Insurance Company Limited was changed to Exide Life Insurance Company Limited (Exide Life Insurance) with immediate effect. It has a presence in over 200 cities across the country and is planned to expand operations in nine centres with major cities being Kolkata, Asansol, Jorhat and states of Bihar and Odisha among others.

References 

Life insurance companies of India
Companies based in Bangalore
Financial services companies established in 2001
Multinational joint-venture companies
2001 establishments in Karnataka
Indian companies established in 2001